Henry Francis Bryan (May 3, 1865 – March 19, 1944) was a United States Navy Rear Admiral and the governor of American Samoa. He served as governor from March 17, 1925, to September 9, 1927. Bryan was one of only three naval governors of the territory who had retired from naval service before serving as governor, the others being John Martin Poyer and his immediate predecessor, Edward Stanley Kellogg. In the Navy, he had numerous commands, and served in the Spanish–American War. His largest command was the Special Service Squadron.

Life

Early life
Bryan was born in Cincinnati, Ohio on May 3, 1865.

Naval career
Bryan became a cadet at the United States Naval Academy on May 2, 1883, and graduated in 1887. Bryan fought in the Spanish–American War. He later filled a post in the Office of Naval Intelligence, where he also briefly served as director from December 1913 to January 1914. He had been promoted to captain on July 1, 1913.

During World War I, Bryan commanded USS Leviathan, for which he was later awarded the Navy Cross. He was frocked as a rear admiral on September 21, 1918. After the war, Bryan was given command of the Special Service Squadron, which patrolled the Caribbean Sea. In 1921, he and his squadron were commanded to protect United States interests during contention in Costa Rica and Panama.

Bryan retired from active duty at his permanent rank of captain on December 31, 1921. He was credited with additional active duty time for his service as naval governor of American Samoa from 1925 to 1927. On June 21, 1930, Bryan was advanced to rear admiral on the retired list.

Governorship
Bryan assumed the governorship on March 17, 1925. While governor, he established the American Samoa Department of Communications. Bryan was one of only three naval governors of the territory who had retired from naval service before serving as governor, the others being John Martin Poyer and Edward Stanley Kellogg.

Bryan retired to Connecticut and was buried at Walnut Grove Cemetery in Meriden, Connecticut.

References

1865 births
1944 deaths
Military personnel from Cincinnati
United States Naval Academy alumni
American military personnel of the Spanish–American War
Directors of the Office of Naval Intelligence
United States Navy personnel of World War I
Recipients of the Navy Cross (United States)
United States Navy rear admirals (upper half)
Governors of American Samoa